K-Narias is a reggaeton/pop music group  formed by twin sisters Gara and Loida H, born on 12 January 1985 in Santa Cruz de Tenerife, Canary Islands, Spain.

K-Narias are twins born and raised in the Canary Islands, specifically in Santa Cruz de Tenerife. In 2007 their song '40 Entre las Dos' reached Gold status in Spain. The song 'No Te Vistas que No Te Vas' is a success in Colombia, Venezuela, Spain and Mexico and was released in 2007. In 2008, they recorded the song 'Un Pedacito de Navidad' with José Feliciano. In 2009, they performed at Madison Square Garden in New York, at a private party for NBA stars in San Juan, Puerto Rico, and at the Playboy Mansion in Los Angeles. In 2010, they toured with the artist Don Omar, traveling to more than 20 cities in the US. At the 2011 Tour of Colombia, they performed in the women's prison El Buen Pastor in Bogotá, as well as the Godmothers in D.F. by an important actress in Mexico, Carmen Salinas. In 2012, they stared in the campaign against school violence with Barcelona goalkeeper Víctor Valdez. In 2013, they recorded the song 'El que a Hierro Mata' with the artist from Puerto Rico, Jerry Rivera. In 2014, they recorded the song 'Pechito version remix' with the artist from Puerto Rico Elvis Crespo. In 2015, they received a double Platinum Record in Spain with the song 'La conocí dancing' reaching number one on Spotify Spain. They have worked in the United States, Mexico, Colombia, Panama, Costa Rica, Venezuela, Martinique and Puerto Rico.

Singers
 Gara Hernández Rubio - singer
 Loida Hernández Rubio - singer

Discography
 40 entre las 2 - 2005 Gold (+50,000) 
 Hombres con pañales - 2006 (CD and DVD) (+35,000)
 K-N - 2007 (15,000)
 Cuando Seas Grande Lo Entenderas - 2008 (+5,000)
La Trayectoria - 2010 (1,000)
Yes we are - 2013 (+10,000)

Music videos
"Oye Mi Canto Feat.Barbero" 
"No Te Vistas Que No Vas" (+50,000)
"Todos Tenemos Que Luchar"
"Quiero Que Bailen"
"Un pedacito de navidad" Feat. Jose Feliciano 
"Himno de Canarias"
"Abusadora"
"No vale la pena" (+1,000)
"Ni tu ni yo"
"Take It Easy"
"De canarias para el mundo"
"El que a hierro mata" (+5,000)
"Juntitos los dos"
"La conoci bailando" 2× Platinum (+100,000)
"Pechito"
"#Traicionero"
"Díselo" ft. Miguel Saéz
"Mujeres"
"Tu Indiferencia"
"Las Que Mandan"
"Tu Novio y el Mío"

Awards

Premios Ace Nueva York
Premio Ace De Nueva York

Premios Fama
Artista Revelacion 2008

Premios Estrella
Mejor Duo Del Año 2008
The twins have won awards such as Fame Awards, Ace New York Awards and Star Awards

See also
Canarian people
Canarian Spanish

External links

References

Spanish twins
Spanish musical duos
People from Santa Cruz de Tenerife
Musicians from the Canary Islands
Twin musical duos
Reggaeton duos
Female musical duos